This is the list of grand viziers (vazīr-e azam) of the Mughal Empire.

History
The seniormost official under the Mughals, or the Prime Minister, held different titles such as Vakil, Vakil-us-Sultanat, Wazir, Diwan, Diwan-i-Ala and Diwan Wazir under different Mughal emperors. Under Babur and Humayun, the institution of the wazirat was not fully developed owing to a lack of an entrenched nobility and political upheaval. Nonetheless, individuals under both rulers did rise to positions equivalent to the position of prime minister and under Humayun reforms were first attempted to clarify the roles of Vakil and Wazir.

In the early years of Akbar's reign, the position of prime minister was first officially held by Bairam Khan as Vakil-us-Sultanat, and he exercised considerable influence over the emperor. Over time the power of the Vakil gradually declined, and during the reign of his successor Jahangir the role of Wazir replaced the Vakil as the most important officer in government. Mughal wazirs were specifically appointed from the ahl-i-qalam(men of the pen) as distinct from the ahl-i-saif(men of the sword). With the abolishment of the post of Wakil, the post was divided into the two offices of Wazir and Mir Bakhshi, where the chief Wazir was the head of the finance department, while the Mir Bakhshi was the head of the military department. These two offices were made jointly responsible for the administration by a system of signatures and counter-signatures. Until the death of Aurangzeb, the post of Wazir was never a threat to the monarchy  as the Wazir could not act too independently. However, after the death of Aurangzeb, the pre-mughal tradition in India of the Wazir being the premier noble at the court and leading counsellor of the king apart from being the head of the financial administration had been re-established.

List of grand viziers

See also
Mughal emperors
Mughal Empire

References